The 1922 Pottsville Maroons season was their 3rd season in existence. The team played independently and would go on to post a 4–4–2 record.

Schedule

Game notes

References
Pro Football Archives: 1922 Pottsville Maroons season

Defunct National Football League teams seasons
1922
Boston
Pottsville Mar